Jiayuguan Airport  is an airport in Jiayuguan City, Gansu Province, China.  It is located 9 kilometers northeast of Jiayuguan and also close to the city of Jiuquan.  First built in 1938 for military use, the airport was rebuilt at the current location in 1953 and was formerly called Jiuquan Airport. It was expanded and reopened in August 2006.

Airlines and destinations

See also
List of airports in China
List of the busiest airports in China

References

Airports in Gansu
Airports established in 2006
2006 establishments in China
Jiayuguan City